Guido Bastianini (born September 10, 1945 in Florence), Italian papyrologist and palaeographer. 

Bastianini completed his papyrological studies in Florence 1970.

He had participated in various archaeological missions in Egypt organized by the Istituto Papirologico "G. Vitelli" and the Egyptian Museum in Cairo (March–April 1969, September–October 1972, April 1973), both on the excavation of Antinoe (September–October 1973, December 1974 - January 1975). 

His appointment as Lecturer in Papyrology at the University of Florence (1981) was immediately followed by the appointment as Full Professor of Papyrology at the University of Milan (same 1981), where he also directed the Papyrological Institute of the same university. He returned to Florence in 1998 and in 1999 he became director of Istituto Papirologico "G. Vitelli". From 2001 to 2007 was president of the Italian Institute for the Egyptian civilization. In 2015 he retired and was nominated Emeritus. During his teaching career, he also was involved in university administration, both in Milan and in Florence. 

Bastianini examined and described Papyrus 93, Milan Papyrus, and several other manuscripts written on papyrus.

With Claudio Gallazzi (University of Milan) he edited the Milan Papyrus (P.Mil.Vogl. VIII 309); with other scholars he edited two volumes (XV and XVI) of the Papiri della Società Italiana (PSI)—the first two appeared since 1957.

Works 

 G. Bastianini - J. Whitehorne, Strategi and Royal Scribes of Roman Egypt, Firenze, Gonnelli 1987 (Papyrologica Florentina XV).
 Commentaria et Lexica Graeca in Papyris reperta (CLGP) ediderunt G. Bastianini, M. Haslam, H. Maehler, F. Montanari, C. Römer, adiuvante M. Stroppa, Pars I. Commentaria et Lexica in Auctores, Vol. 1. Fasc. 1: Aeschines-Alcaeus, München-Leipzig, Saur 2004.
 Commentaria et Lexica Greca in Papyris reperta (CLGP) ediderunt G. Bastianini, M. Haslam, H. Maehler, F. Montanari, C. Römer, adiuvante M. Stroppa, I.1.4 (Aristophanes-Bacchylides), München-Leipzig 2006, XXXII+310 pp.
 Bastianini G. - Gallazzi C. (edd.), Papiri dell’Università di Milano - Posidippo di Pella. Epigrammi, LED Edizioni Universitarie, Milano, 2001, 
 Austin C. - Bastianini G. (edd.), Posidippi Pellaei quae supersunt omnia, LED Edizioni Universitarie, Milano, 2002,

References

External links 
 Guido Bastianini - Curriculum Vitae Il Portale Italiano di Archeologica
 Guido Bastianini Dipartimento di Scienze dell'Antichità
 Ordinario di Papirologia nell'Università degli Studi di Firenze e Direttore dell'Istituto
 Tipologie dei Rotolie Problemi di Riconstruzione

1945 births
Italian papyrologists
Living people
Italian palaeographers